Trieben is a town in Styria in central Austria, in the Palten River Valley. It is a quaint town with a Globe sculpture in the Main Square.

Population

References

External links
 

Cities and towns in Liezen District